Tobruk or Tobruck (Antipyrgos; ; ; ; also transliterated as Tobruch and Tubruk) is a port city on Libya's eastern Mediterranean coast, near the border with Egypt. It is the capital of the Butnan District (formerly Tobruk District) and has a population of 120,000 (2011 est.).

Tobruk was the site of an ancient Greek colony and, later, of a Roman fortress guarding the frontier of Cyrenaica. Over the centuries, Tobruk also served as a waystation along the coastal caravan route. By 1911, Tobruk had become an Italian military post, but during World War II, Allied forces, mainly the Australian 6th Division, took Tobruk on 22 January 1941. The Australian 9th Division ("The Rats of Tobruk") pulled back to Tobruk to avoid encirclement after actions at Er Regima and Mechili and reached Tobruk on 9 April 1941 where prolonged fighting against German and Italian forces followed.

Although the siege was lifted by Operation Crusader in November 1941, a renewed offensive by Axis forces under Erwin Rommel the following year resulted in Tobruk being captured in June 1942 and held by the Axis forces until November 1942, when it was recaptured by the Allies. Rebuilt after World War II, Tobruk was later expanded during the 1960s to include a port terminal linked by an oil pipeline to the Sarir oil field.

King Idris of Libya had his palace at Bab Zaytun. Tobruk was traditionally a stronghold of the Senussi royal dynasty and one of the first to rebel against Muammar Gaddafi in the Arab Spring.

Geography

Tobruk has a strong, naturally protected deep harbour. It is probably the best natural port in northern Africa, although due to the lack of important nearby land sites it is certainly not the most popular. The city is effectively surrounded by a desert lightly populated with nomadic herdsmen who travel from oasis to oasis.

There are many escarpments (cliffs) to the south of Tobruk, as is common across Cyrenaica, the eastern half of Libya. These escarpments generally have their high sides to the south and their low sides (dip slopes) to the north. This constitutes a substantial physical barrier between the north and south of Libya in the Tobruk area.

Tobruk suffers a serious saltwater intrusion problem. A factory for the desalination of sea water has been built there.

Climate
Tobruk features a hot desert climate (BWh according to the Köppen climate classification.)

History

Antiquity

An Ancient Greek agricultural colony, Antipyrgus (Antipyrgos) was once on the site of modern Tobruk, and the ancient name is still occasionally in use. The name roughly meant "across from Pyrgos", referring to a location in Crete across the Mediterranean Sea from Antipyrgos. In the Roman era, the town became a Roman fortress guarding the Cyrenaican frontier.

With the spread of Christianity, Antipyrgus became an episcopal see. Only one of its ancient bishops is known by name: Aemilianus, who took part in the Second Council of Constantinople in 553. No longer a residential bishopric, Antipyrgus is today listed by the Catholic Church as a titular see.

Later the site became a way station on the caravan route that ran along the coast.

Modern history
The Hotel Tobruk was built in 1937.

World War II

At the beginning of World War II, Libya was an Italian colony and Tobruk became the site of important battles between the Allies and Axis powers.  Tobruk was strategically important to the conquest of Eastern Libya, then the province of Cyrenaica, for several reasons.

Strategic importance

Tobruk had a deep, natural, and protected harbour, which meant that even if the port were bombed, ships would still be able to anchor there and be safe from squalls, so the port could never be rendered wholly useless regardless of military bombardment. This was of critical importance, as it made Tobruk an excellent place to supply a desert warfare campaign. It was also heavily fortified by the Italians prior to their invasion of Egypt in November 1940.

In addition to these prepared fortifications, there were a number of escarpments and cliffs to the south of Tobruk, providing substantial physical barriers to any advance on the port over land. Tobruk was also on a peninsula, allowing it to be defended by a minimal number of troops, which the Allies used to their advantage when the port was under siege. An attacker could not simply bypass the defenders, for if they did, the besieged would sally forth and cut off the nearby supply lines of the attacker, spoiling their advance.

But Tobruk was also strategically significant, due to its location with regard to the remainder of Cyrenaica. Attackers from the east who had secured Tobruk could then advance through the desert to Benghazi, cutting off all enemy troops along the coast, such as those at Derna. This advance would be protected from counterattack, due to escarpments that were quite difficult for a military force to climb, running generally from Tobruk to Suluq. Due to the importance of maintaining supply in the desert, getting cut off in this area was disastrous. Therefore, whoever held both Suluq and Tobruk controlled the majority of Cyrenaica.

This was significant due to the importance of air power in desert warfare.

Italian advance
Italian forces (and their native Libyan allies—about two divisions of the latter) invaded Egypt in early September 1940 but halted their advance after a week and dug in at Sidi Barrani. In early December, British Empire forces—an armoured division and two infantry divisions—launched a counterstrike codenamed Operation Compass. The Italians had previously invaded Albania and occupied part of the south of France, and had now made a military incursion into a British protectorate.

British capture of Tobruk

The counterstrike involved the British pocketing two of the Italian camps against the Mediterranean, forcing their surrender. This led to a general Italian retreat to El Agheila. Tobruk was captured by British, Australian and Indian forces on 22 January 1941.

Italy called on her German ally, which sent an army corps, under the name Deutsches Afrika Korps (DAK). Italy also sent several more divisions to Libya.  These forces, under Lieutenant-General Erwin Rommel, drove the Allies back across Cyrenaica to the Egyptian border, leaving Tobruk isolated and under siege. The defenders of the fortress consisted of the Australian 9th Division, the Australian 18th Brigade and some British tanks and artillery. They were later reinforced and replaced by the British 70th Infantry Division, Polish Independent Carpathian Rifle Brigade, a Czechoslovak battalion and a British tank brigade. The siege lasted until December, when Operation Crusader pushed the DAK and Italians back out of Cyrenaica.

German capture of Tobruk

Rommel's second offensive took place in May and June 1942. Tobruk was taken in an outflanking attack on 21 June 1942, capturing the largest number of British Commonwealth troops after the fall of Singapore earlier in the year, where over 80,000 were captured. Rommel was promoted to Generalfeldmarschall, shortly thereafter and was the youngest in the Wehrmacht Heer to achieve this rank. The following units were deployed in Tobruk on 20 June 1942, and most of them were captured by the Axis forces:
 2nd South African Infantry Division
 4th Royal Tank Regiment
 7th Royal Tank Regiment
 3rd Battalion, Coldstream Guards
 1st Battalion, Sherwood Foresters
 1st Battalion, Worcestershire Regiment
 2nd Battalion, Queen's Own Cameron Highlanders
 2nd Battalion, 5th Mahratta Light Infantry
 2nd Battalion, 7th Gurkha Rifles
 67 Medium Regiment, Royal Artillery
 68 Medium Regiment, Royal Artillery
 25th Field Regiment, Royal Artillery

British recapture
Tobruk remained in Axis hands until 11 November 1942, when the Allies captured it after the Second Battle of El Alamein. It remained in Allied hands thereafter. Although not as much a reason for its strategic significance, the British built a rail line from El Alamein to Tobruk during the course of the war. This rail line was significant both for purposes of supply and as a sense of pride to the Allied troops, as the rail line was built through a little-populated, inhospitable desert.

Libyan Civil Wars

At the outset of the 2011 Libyan Civil War, the city quickly came under the control of the NTC. In September 2014 the internationally recognized government of Libya relocated to a Greek car ferry in Tobruk harbor. A rival New General National Congress parliament continued to operate in Tripoli. In October 2014 they again re-located, to a hotel named Dar al-Salam also known as the Al Masira Hotel in Tobruk. In November 2014 that government was declared illegal by Libya's highest court.

Notable people
Professor Omar El Barasi (b. 1951), who once managed the Libyan branch of Society of Petroleum Engineers, and later became a deputy of Libya PM Abdurrahim El-Keib is from Tobruk and gained his doctorate in petroleum engineering from Waseda University, Japan.

Abulgassem Tayeb AL-Sharef (1943-2019), who had managed several oil companies and was once the "youngest" General Manager of the international Marketing of oil products in Libya (Elbrega Company), also he was the General Manager of the Petroleum Industries in the National Oil Corporation .

One of the founders of the Mellita oil complex, west of Libya, which was considered the largest gas project in the world at the time ,

He was a Member of the French Libyan Chamber of Commerce and Industry, representing the Libyan oil sector .

Eman al-Obeidi, a Libyan woman who was abused by the Gaddafi government during the Libyan Civil War, is from Tobruk.

Omar Mukhtar was born in Zanjhur, near Tobruk.

See also
 List of cities in Libya
 Railway stations in Libya
 Knightsbridge War Cemetery WW2 British Commonwealth Cemetery

Notes
 On 1 January 1934, Tripolitania, Cyrenaica, and Fezzan were united as the Italian colony of Libya. However, during World War II these names continued to be used.

References

External links

 Tobruk: Australian toughness beats Rommel
 Tobruk War cemetery - video

Baladiyat of Libya
Antipyrgos
Cyrenaica
Greek colonies in Libya
Populated places in Butnan District
Port cities and towns in Libya